Adrienne Stiff-Roberts is an American electrical engineering and Jeffrey N. Vinik Professor of Electrical and computer engineering at Duke University. Her research is on novel hybrid materials for optoelectronic and energy devices.

Early life and education 
Stiff-Roberts completed her bachelor's degree in physics at Spelman College in 1991. She was part of a NASA and Spelman College Women in Science and Engineering program. Through this progem, Stiff-Roberts worked as an intern at Ames Research Center during the summer. She then joined the Georgia Institute of Technology, where she earned a Bachelor of Engineering in 1999. She moved to the University of Michigan for her graduate studies, during which she investigated quantum dot photodetectors, gaining her PhD in 2004. She was a member of Phi Beta Kappa. She was funded by the David and Lucile Packard Foundation Graduate Scholars Fellowship and AT&T Labs Fellowship. She was also awarded the Burroughs Wellcome Fund.

Research and career 
At Duke University, which she joined in 2004, Stiff-Roberts leads a lab focussed on Resonant Infrared Matrix-Assisted Pulsed Laser Evaporation (RIR-MAPLE). This is a versatile technology that has evolved from pulsed laser deposition, which offers precise control of a material's composition. The technique involves freezing a solution of molecular building blocks, then blasting them with a laser in a vacuum chamber. The laser is tuned to the molecular bonds of the frozen solvent. She is working with David Mitzi to create perovskite solar cells.

Stiff-Roberts is involved with several initiatives to improve diversity within engineering. At Duke University Stiff-Roberts runs the Student Engineers Network, Strengthening Opportunities in Research (SENSOR) Saturday Academy for minority students in the 8th grade.  In 2017, Stiff-Roberts took part in Duke University's celebration of Hidden Figures. She is a member of the National Society of Black Physicists.

In 2019, Stiff-Roberts was promoted to be the Jeffrey N. Vinik Professor of Electrical and Computer Engineering.

Honors and awards 

 2016 Julian Abele Award for Graduate Mentor of the Year, Duke University Mary Lou Williams Center, Black Student Alliance, and Black Graduate and Professional Student Association. 2016
 2009 Institute of Electrical and Electronics Engineers Early Career Award in Nanotechnology 
 2008 Presidential Early Career Award for Scientists and Engineers, Office of Naval Research 
 2007 Young Investigator Program Award, Office of Naval Research
 2006 National Science Foundation CAREER Award

References 

21st-century American engineers
African-American scientists
Duke University faculty
21st-century engineers
Spelman College alumni
University of Michigan alumni
Georgia Tech alumni
Living people
Year of birth missing (living people)
Members of the National Society of Black Physicists